Kaarnama  is a  1990 Bollywood film written, produced and directed by actor Ranjeet. Ranjeet had also directed the Rahul Roy and Anu Aggarwal-starrer Ghazab Tamasha. Kaarnama was based on a horse race. It had a very different story line and was well made by director Ranjit. Farha, Vinod Khanna and Amrish Puri did their best, but it was Kimi Katkar who stole the show and did extraordinary work. Cast includes Vinod Khanna, Kimi Katkar, Farha Naaz, Neena Gupta, Paintal, Nirupa Roy and Amrish Puri. Farha's role in Kaarnama, opposite Vinod Khanna and Woh Phir Ayegi are considered her best roles ever offered to her. By that time, she had married Dara Singh's son Vindu Dara Singh.

Cast
Vinod Khanna
Kimi Katkar
Farha Naaz
Amrish Puri
Paintal
Nirupa Roy
Neena Gupta

Music
Lyrics: Ravindra Jain

"Ki Karan Dus Ki Karan" - Sushil Kumar, Asha Bhosle
"Aurat" - Neena Gupta
"Kab Aankh Ladai Kab Kudi Patai" - Hemlata, Dilraj Kaur, Shabbir Kumar, Sushil Kumar
"Umariya Kaise Chhupayegi" - Hemlata, Dilraj Kaur, Shabbir Kumar, Sushil Kumar

External links
 

1990 films
Films scored by Ravindra Jain
1990s Hindi-language films
Indian horse racing films